Crossness is a location in the London Borough of Bexley, close to the southern bank of the River Thames, to the east of Thamesmead, west of Belvedere and north-west of Erith. The place takes its name from Cross Ness, a specific promontory on the southern bank of the River Thames. In maritime terms, the tip of Cross Ness, in the past referred to as 'Leather Bottle Point', marks the boundary between Barking Reach and Halfway Reach. An unmanned lighthouse on Crossness is a navigational aid to shipping.

Sewer
Crossness is the location of the Crossness Sewage Treatment Works, which includes the historic Victorian Crossness Pumping Station, built at the eastern end of the Southern Outfall Sewer as part of the London sewerage system designed by Sir Joseph Bazalgette and constructed between 1859 and 1865.

Lighthouse
Crossness lighthouse is a steel lattice structure. The light is at an elevation of 41 feet (12.5 m) and gives a white 5-second flash visible for 8 miles (12.9 km).

Access and recreation
Crossness Nature Reserve is east of the sewage works.

The Ridgeway path, owned by Thames Water and built on top of the southern outfall sewer, stretches  between Plumstead railway station and the Crossness sewage treatment works.

The Thames Path Extension - from the Thames Barrier to Crayford Ness - runs along the southern bank of the river through Crossness.

See also 
 Northern Outfall Sewer
 Beckton Sewage Treatment Works
 Mogden Sewage Treatment Works
 Riverside Sewage Treatment Works, Rainham

References 

Areas of London
Districts of the London Borough of Bexley
Districts of London on the River Thames